South Reviews  is a centre-left biweekly politics and economics magazine based in Guangzhou, China. A subsidiary of Guangzhou Daily Press Group (广州日报报业集团), the magazine was established in April 1985. With a circulation of 660,000 copies per issue, it is the most popular magazine covering politics and economics in China.

In July 2011, the magazine published an interview with Taiwanese historian Tang Chi-hua. Upon this, the president and editor of the magazine removed from the posts.

See also

 List of magazines in China

References

External links
 

1985 establishments in China
Biweekly magazines
Business magazines published in China
Chinese-language magazines
Political magazines published in China
Magazines established in 1985
Mass media in Guangzhou